Loch Lomond may refer to:

Places
Australia
Loch Lomond, Queensland, a locality in the Southern Downs Region

Canada
Loch Lomond, a region in Saint John, New Brunswick
Loch Lomond (Cape Breton), Nova Scotia
Loch Lomond, Cape Breton Island, Nova Scotia
Loch Lomond (Algoma District), a lake, Ontario 
Loch Lomond (Thunder Bay District), a lake near the city of Thunder Bay, Ontario
Loch Lomond, Newfoundland and Labrador, a settlement

Scotland
Loch Lomond in Scotland

United States
Loch Lomond (California), a lake in Santa Cruz County
Loch Lomond, California, a small town in Lake County
Loch Lomond, Florida, a neighborhood of Pompano Beach
Loch Lomond (Illinois), a lake
Loch Lomond, Virginia, a census-designated place

Music
 "The Bonnie Banks o' Loch Lomond", a Scottish poem and folk song sometimes referred to as "Loch Lomond"
Loch Lomond (band), a band from Portland, Oregon, USA

Others
The Loch Lomond distillery in Alexandria, Scotland, near Loch Lomond
Loch Lomond Stadial, another name for the Younger Dryas ice age